Tag is an unincorporated community in the Ozark National Forest, Pope County, Arkansas, United States.

References

Unincorporated communities in Pope County, Arkansas
Unincorporated communities in Arkansas